Levan Kalyayev (May 16, 1929 – August 19, 1983) was a Soviet athlete who competed mainly in the 100 metres.

He competed for the USSR in the 1952 Summer Olympics held in Helsinki, Finland in the 4 x 100 metre relay where he won the silver medal with his team mates Boris Tokarev, Levan Sanadze and Vladimir Sukharev.

References

Levan Kalyayev's grave 

1929 births
1983 deaths
Soviet male sprinters
Russian male sprinters
Olympic silver medalists for the Soviet Union
Athletes (track and field) at the 1952 Summer Olympics
Olympic athletes of the Soviet Union
European Athletics Championships medalists
Medalists at the 1952 Summer Olympics
Olympic silver medalists in athletics (track and field)